This is a list of mayors of the city of Portland, Oregon. Under Portland's system of government, members of the City Council (known as Commissioners) have many duties that are generally the domain of a mayor.

The current term for mayor of Portland is four years. Mayoral elections are held in May of US presidential election years (years divisible by four), during the Oregon primary election, with a runoff between the top two vote-getters held in November of the same year should no candidate garner a majority vote in the May election.  The mayor-elect takes office the following January.

List

Note: The color shown in the number (#) column denotes political party (red for Republican, blue for Democratic, teal for the People's Party (Populist), gray for Independent).

The City of Portland mayor's office, in the City Hall, contains a collection of mounted portraits of all the mayors to date. As of November 2014 only two mayors are missing from the collection; William H. Farrar (1862–1863), and Hamilton Boyd (1868–1869).

See also
 List of mayors of places in Oregon
 Lists of Oregon-related topics

References

External links
 List of mayors from Portland auditor's office

Portland, Oregon
 
Mayors